James is a common English language surname and given name:
James (name), a typically masculine first name 
 James (surname)

James or James City may also refer to:

People
 King James (disambiguation), various kings named James
 Saint James (disambiguation)
 James (musician)
 James, brother of Jesus

Places

Canada
 James Bay, a large body of water
 James, Ontario

United Kingdom
 James College, a college of the University of York

United States
 James, Georgia, an unincorporated community
 James, Iowa, an unincorporated community
 James City, North Carolina
 James City County, Virginia
 James City (Virginia Company)
 James City Shire
 James City, Pennsylvania
 St. James City, Florida

Arts, entertainment, and media
 James (2005 film), a Bollywood film
 James (2008 film), an Irish short film
 James (2022 film), an Indian Kannada-language film
 James the Red Engine, a character in Thomas the Tank Engine & Friends
 James (band), a band from Manchester
 James, US title of 1991 re-release of their album Gold Mother
 James (Phoebe Ryan EP), a 2017 extended play by American singer-songwriter Phoebe Ryan
 “James”, a song by Carly Simon from Come Upstairs
 “James”, a song by Pat Metheny and Lyle Mays from Offramp
 “James”, a 1976 single by American singer-songwriter Billy Joel; see

Science and technology
 Apache James, (Java Apache Mail Enterprise Server)
 James's theorem, theorem in mathematics
 A muscadine (Vitis rotundifolia) cultivar

Other uses
 Epistle of James, part of the New Testament
 James Cycle Co, a British cycle and motorcycle manufacturer
 James (HBC vessel), operated by the HBC from 1682-1683, see Hudson's Bay Company vessels

See also
 
 James Lake (disambiguation)
 James River (disambiguation)
 Jim (disambiguation)
 Jimbo (disambiguation)
 Jimmy (disambiguation)
 Jamestown (disambiguation)
 Justice James (disambiguation)